Novopavlovsky is a rural locality (a khutor) in Peschanovskoye Rural Settlement, Serafimovichsky District, Volgograd Oblast, Russia. The population was 83 as of 2010. There are 5 streets.

Geography 
Novopavlovsky is located 80 km southwest of Serafimovich (the district's administrative centre) by road. Pronin is the nearest rural locality.

References 

Rural localities in Serafimovichsky District